Wide Channel is an inside passage of the Chilean Patagonia.

Wide Channel is flanked by precipitous mountains. The fjords Europa and Penguin open into this channel.

See also
List of fjords, channels, sounds and straits of Chile

References

Straits of Chile
Bodies of water of Magallanes Region